Cathorops tuyra, the Besudo sea catfish, is a species of sea catfish. It is found in shallow coastal and estuarine waters of the eastern Pacific from Costa Rica to southern Peru. Maximum recorded body length is 29 cm.

References

Ariidae
Fish described in 1923
Taxa named by Seth Eugene Meek
Taxa named by Samuel Frederick Hildebrand